The King and I is a 1956 American musical film made by 20th Century-Fox, directed by Walter Lang and produced by Charles Brackett and Darryl F. Zanuck. The screenplay by Ernest Lehman is based on the 1951 Rodgers and Hammerstein musical The King and I, based on the 1944 novel Anna and the King of Siam by Margaret Landon. That novel in turn was based on memoirs written by Anna Leonowens, who became school teacher to the children of King Mongkut of Siam in the early 1860s. Leonowens' stories were autobiographical, although various elements of them have been called into question. The film stars Deborah Kerr and Yul Brynner.

The film was a critical and commercial success, and was nominated for 9 Oscars, winning 5, including Best Actor for Brynner.

An animated film adaptation of the same musical was released in 1999. On February 12, 2021, Paramount Pictures and Temple Hill Entertainment announced that another live-action film version was in development.

Plot
A widowed schoolteacher, Anna, arrives in Bangkok with her young son, Louis, after being summoned to tutor the many children of King Mongkut. Both are introduced to the intimidating Kralahome, Siam's prime minister, who escorts them to the Royal Palace, where they will live, although Anna had been promised her own house. The King ignores her objections and introduces her to his head wife, Lady Thiang. Anna also meets a recent concubine, a young Burmese, Tuptim, and the fifteen children she will tutor, including his son and heir, Prince Chulalongkorn. In conversation with the other wives, Anna learns Tuptim is in love with Lun Tha, who brought her to Siam.

Anna still wants her own house and teaches the children about the virtues of home life, to the King's irritation, who disapproves of the influence of other cultures. She comes across Lun Tha and learns that he has been meeting Tuptim in secret. He asks her to arrange a rendezvous. The lovers meet under cover of darkness, and Lun Tha promises he will one day return to Siam and that they will escape together.

King Mongkut becomes troubled over rumors that the British regard him as a barbaric leader and are sending a delegation, including Anna's old admirer, Sir Edward, possibly to turn Siam into a protectorate. Anna persuades the King to receive them in European style by hosting a banquet with European food and music. In return, the King promises to give Anna her own house.

Sir Edward reminisces with Anna in an attempt to bring her back to British society. The King presents Tuptim's version of Uncle Tom's Cabin as a traditional Siamese ballet. However, the King and the Kralahome are not impressed, as the play involves slavery and shows the slaveholding King drowning in the river. During the show, Tuptim left the room to run away with Lun Tha.

After the guests have departed, the king reveals that Tuptim is missing. Anna explains that Tuptim is unhappy because she is just another woman in his eyes. The King retorts that men are entitled to a plenitude of wives, although women must remain faithful. Anna explains the reality of one man loving only one woman and recalls her first dance before she teaches the King how to dance the polka, but the touching moment is shattered when the Kralahome bursts into the room with the news Tuptim has been captured. For her dishonor, the King prepares to whip her despite Anna's pleas. She declares he is indeed a barbarian. The King then crumples, puts his hand over his heart, and runs out of the room. The Kralahome blames Anna for ruining him as Tuptim is led away in tears after learning Lun Tha was found dead and dumped into the river. That causes Anna to sever all ties as a governess and declare she will leave on the next boat from Siam.

On the night of her departure, Anna learns that the King is dying. Lady Thiang gives Anna his unfinished letter stating his deep gratitude and respect for her, despite their differences. Moments before the ship departs, he gives Anna his ring, as she has always spoken the truth to him, and persuades her and Louis to stay in Bangkok. He passes his title to Prince Chulalongkorn, who then issues a proclamation that states that all subjects will no longer bow down to him but will still respect him. The King dies, satisfied that his kingdom will be all right, and Anna lovingly presses her cheek to his hand.

Cast

 Deborah Kerr as Anna Leonowens
 Yul Brynner as King Mongkut of Siam
 Rita Moreno as Tuptim
 Terry Saunders as Lady Thiang
 Martin Benson as Kralahome
 Rex Thompson as Louis Leonowens
 Patrick Adiarte as Prince Chulalongkorn
 Alan Mowbray as Sir John Hay
 Geoffrey Toone as Sir Edward Ramsay
 Carlos Rivas as Lun Tha
 Judy Dan as Royal Wife (uncredited)

Voice only
Three actors in the film had their singing voices dubbed by other people. The dubbed voices belonged to:
 Marni Nixon as Anna (for which she was paid $10,000)
 Leona Gordon as Tuptim
 Reuben Fuentes as Lun Tha

Musical numbers
 Overture – Played by the 20th Century-Fox Orchestra
 I Whistle a Happy Tune – Sung by Deborah Kerr (dubbed by Marni Nixon) and Rex Thompson
 The March of the Siamese Children – Played by the 20th Century-Fox Orchestra
 Hello, Young Lovers – Sung by Deborah Kerr (dubbed by Marni Nixon)
 A Puzzlement – Sung by Yul Brynner
 Getting to Know You – Sung by Deborah Kerr (dubbed by Marni Nixon) and Chorus
 We Kiss in a Shadow/I Have Dreamed – Sung by Carlos Rivas (dubbed by Reuben Fuentes) and Rita Moreno (dubbed by Leona Gordon)
 Something Wonderful – Sung by Terry Saunders
 Finale, Act I – Sung by Yul Brynner and Chorus
 Entr'acte – Played by the 20th Century-Fox Orchestra
 The Small House of Uncle Thomas (Ballet) – Narrated by Rita Moreno, Sung and Danced by Chorus and Dancers
 Song of the King – Sung by Yul Brynner
 Shall We Dance? – Sung and Danced by Deborah Kerr (dubbed by Marni Nixon) and Yul Brynner
 Finale (Something Wonderful) – Sung by Chorus

Production
The musical was written for Gertrude Lawrence, and her appearance in the film was contractually guaranteed. However, she was diagnosed with cancer while playing the role on Broadway and died during the run. Dinah Shore, a singer as well as an actress, was considered for the role of Anna in the movie. Maureen O'Hara, who had a pleasant soprano voice, was originally cast, but Richard Rodgers did not agree to the casting. It was Yul Brynner who pressed for Deborah Kerr to play the role. Marni Nixon provided Kerr's singing for the film. Nixon and Kerr worked side-by-side in the recording studio for songs which combined speaking and singing. Nixon would also dub Kerr's singing the following year, for the film An Affair to Remember.

Donald Bogle's biography of Dorothy Dandridge claims that Dandridge was offered the role of Tuptim in partial fulfillment of her three-picture contract with 20th Century-Fox, but that Dandridge allowed Otto Preminger (her former director and then-lover) to talk her out of it because it was not the lead role. Rumors also circulated that Dandridge, as an African American, did not want to play a slave. Rita Moreno, who was under contract to Fox, was invited merely for a test, but impressed the producers enough to be selected for the part. Moreno later stated in an interview that France Nuyen was also up for the part, and Moreno believed Nuyen would get it, but since Nuyen was not a contract player with the studio, she was not cast.

Reprising their Broadway stage roles, Saunders played Thiang, Adiarte was Chulalongkorn and Benson was the Kralahome, and dancers Yuriko and de Lappe also reprised their stage roles. Alan Mowbray appeared in the new role of the British Ambassador, while Sir Edward Ramsey (demoted to the Ambassador's aide) was played by Geoffrey Toone. The cinematography was by Leon Shamroy, the art direction by John DeCuir and Lyle R. Wheeler and the costume design by Irene Sharaff. The choreography used for the film was the choreography developed by Jerome Robbins for the original stage production.

Three songs from the original stage production were recorded for, and appeared on, the film's soundtrack, but do not appear in the motion picture: "Shall I Tell You What I Think of You?", "I Have Dreamed" and "My Lord and Master". "I Have Dreamed" and another song that was not used in the film, "Western People Funny", survive in the released film only as orchestral underscoring. In the film, the first half of the "Song of the King" was turned into ordinary spoken dialogue, with only some of the words sung, minus the king's opening lyrics, but it survives as it was actually written on the soundtrack album.

A special 50th Anniversary edition was released in 2006, which promised to restore the lost numbers, but it included only the audio and some still photographs for "Shall I Tell You?"  This would seem to indicate that no footage exists of these numbers. An off-screen choral reprise of "Something Wonderful" was added to serve as the film's finale; the stage version ends with musical underscoring, but no singing. None of the other reprises of the songs were retained in the film version.

The film was one of the only two films shot in the then-new 55 mm CinemaScope 55 format, the other being Carousel, which was released several months earlier. Although the promotion for the film made much of it being shot in CinemaScope 55, it was only released in the standard 35 mm CinemaScope format, with 4-channel stereo instead of the 6-channel stereo originally promised. CinemaScope 55 was never used or promoted again after this production, and Fox would later invest in Todd-AO and adopt its 65/70mm process, after changing it to the more conventional 24 frames/second, and contracting with Mitchell Camera for all-new FC ("Fox Camera") and BFC ("Blimped Fox Camera") cameras, and with Bausch & Lomb for all-new "Super Baltar" lenses. Numerous features were made in the Fox-revised Todd-AO process.

In 1961, it was re-released for the first time in a 70 mm format, under Fox's "Grandeur 70" trademark. For this release, the six-channel version of the stereo soundtrack was finally used.  In 1966, it was re-released again, this time in Cinemascope, before being sold to television in 1967.

Reception
The film premiered at New York's Roxy Theatre on June 28, 1956. It was a big success upon release, both critically and financially, becoming the fifth highest-grossing film of 1956 with rentals of $8.5 million. Some reviewers criticized the film for its changes in dialogue from the Broadway production and the omission of some songs. On Rotten Tomatoes the film has a 93% rating based on reviews from 27 critics.

The King and I has been banned in Thailand because of its representation of King Mongkut. The same is the case with most other adaptations of Anna and the King.

Soundtrack album

The film soundtrack album was first released on Capitol Records. It restored three songs recorded for the film but not included in the final release print: "My Lord and Master", "I Have Dreamed", and "Shall I Tell You What I Think of You?". The latter two were filmed but no footage survives. Added to the original LP and CD releases of the film was a seven-minute overture not heard at the beginning of the film. The album was first issued only in mono in 1956, but, as with the Rodgers and Hammerstein films Oklahoma! (1955) and Carousel (1956), the sound on the film had been recorded in what was then state-of-the-art stereo, which made it possible, with the advent of stereo on records, for Capitol to release a stereo version of the soundtrack album in 1958. As with Oklahoma! and Carousel, the recording lathes of that time made it necessary for part of the album to be omitted in the stereo version, so half of "Getting To Know You" was cut in that edition.

The film soundtrack album of The King and I was issued on CD first by Capitol and then by Angel Records. The first two editions of the CD were exact duplicates of the LP, but in 2001, as with the Oklahoma! and Carousel soundtracks, Angel issued a new, expanded edition of the album, which not only featured all the songs (including the ballet "The Small House of Uncle Thomas"), but some of the film's incidental music, as well as the original main title music. The Overture heard on the LP version and on the first two editions of the CD was included as a bonus track.

Chart positions

Awards and nominations

American Film Institute
 AFI's 100 Years...100 Passions - #31
 AFI's 100 Years...100 Heroes and Villains:
 Anna Leonowens - Nominated (Hero)
 AFI's 100 Years...100 Songs:
 "Getting to Know You" - Nominated 
 "Shall We Dance?" - #54
 AFI's 100 Years...100 Movie Quotes:
 "Et cetera, et cetera, et cetera." - Nominated
 AFI's 100 Years of Musicals - #11
 AFI's 100 Years...100 Movies (10th Anniversary Edition) - Nominated

Remake
On February 12, 2021, it was announced that Paramount Pictures acquired the rights to produce a new live-action film version of the musical, with Temple Hill Entertainment's Marty Bowen and Wyck Godfrey producing. Concord, who owns the Rodgers and Hammerstein catalog, will also serve in a producing capacity. A director and writer have yet to be attached.

See also
 List of American films of 1956

References

Sources
 Hischak, Thomas S.  The Rodgers and Hammerstein Encyclopedia.  Westport, Conn.:  Greenwood Publishing Group, 2007.  .

External links

 
 
 
 
 

The King and I
1956 musical films
1950s romantic musical films
1956 films
1956 soundtrack albums
20th Century Fox films
American romantic drama films
American romantic musical films
Best Musical or Comedy Picture Golden Globe winners
Films about royalty
Films adapted into television shows
Films based on adaptations
Films based on musicals
Films directed by Walter Lang
Films featuring a Best Actor Academy Award-winning performance
Films featuring a Best Musical or Comedy Actress Golden Globe winning performance
Films produced by Charles Brackett
Films scored by Alfred Newman
Films scored by Ken Darby
Films that won the Best Costume Design Academy Award
Films that won the Best Original Score Academy Award
Films that won the Best Sound Mixing Academy Award
Films set in the 1860s
Films set in Thailand
Films whose art director won the Best Art Direction Academy Award
Films with screenplays by Ernest Lehman
Musical films based on actual events
Cultural depictions of Anna Leonowens
Cultural depictions of Mongkut
Censored films
CinemaScope films
Film controversies in Thailand
1950s English-language films
1950s American films